On April 4, 1975, as 1st Independent Division of Jiangsu Provincial Military District was inactivated, the divisional HQ of 74th Army Division moved to Binhai, Jiangsu, taking command of four regiments(1st to 3rd infantry, artillery) left by 1st Independent division. In May the second formation of 1st Independent Division of Jiangsu Provincial Military District() was officially formed.

In January 1976 the division was renamed as Independent Division of Jiangsu Provincial Military District() following 2nd Independent Division of Jiangsu Provincial Military District's disbandment.

In early 1979, about 600 personnel from the division was transferred to Guangxi to take part in the Sino-Vietnamese War.

In January 1981 the division was disbanded. Its artillery regiment became Artillery Regiment, 3rd Garrison Division of Nanjing Military Region; its 2nd Infantry Regiment was disbanded; its 1st and 3rd Infantry Regiment became independent.

References

Infantry divisions of the People's Liberation Army
Military units and formations established in 1976
Military units and formations disestablished in 1981